is a private senior high school in  Shirokane, Minato, Tokyo. Affiliated with Meiji Gakuin University (学校法人明治学院), it originated from the Meiji Gakuin, which was established in 1887 and housed a five-year secondary education program, originally only for boys. After World War I this was modified into separate junior high school and senior high school programs. The school became coeducational in 1991.

Notable alumni
Tōson Shimazaki - writer
Wada Eisaku - painter
Masuda Takashi - industrialist
Morinosuke Chiwaki - dentist
Numa Morikazu - politician
Yi Kwang-su - Korean independence activist
Yoshie Fujiwara - operatic tenor
Misao Tamai - footballer

References

External links

 Meiji Gakuin Senior High School
 English information

High schools in Tokyo